Modern Thinkers Party of Islamic Iran (MTPII;  hezb-e novândišân-e Irân-e Eslâmi) is a conservative political party in Iran. It was co-founded in 2006 by Amir Mohebbian, Gholamhosein Mohammadi, and MPs Abolfazl Kalhor and Hosein Noushabadi.

It is considered a modernist and moderate party, supporting social justice and social freedom. The party advocated pro-poor policies and dialogue with the political elite.

According to Simon Tisdall, it is a right-wing traditionalist party.

References

2006 establishments in Iran
Political parties established in 2006
Principlist political groups in Iran